Emil Kheri Imsgard (born 6 March 1998) is a Norwegian handball player for Elverum Håndball and the Norwegian national team.

He was chosen to represent Norway at the 2023 World Men's Handball Championship.

References

1998 births
Living people
Norwegian male handball players